Astley Baker Davies is an English independent animation studio based in London, England, owned by founder-directors Neville Astley, Mark Baker, and Phil Davies. It is the production company behind television series The Big Knights, Peppa Pig, and Ben & Holly's Little Kingdom. In 2015, it became a subsidiary of Entertainment One.

On 16 March 2021, it was announced that Entertainment One renewed Peppa Pig until 2027, and after 17 years, the original creators and the company were going to leave production. Animation studio Karrot Animation (known for producing Sarah & Duck) will take over production from then on.

Filmography

Film
Peppa Pig: The Golden Boots (2015)
Peppa Pig: My First Cinema Experience (2017)
Peppa Pig: Festival of Fun (2019)

Television

Awards and nominations

 2012 - British Animation Awards - Winner for Best Preschool Series for "Ben and Holly's Little Kingdom: Acorn Day"

References

External links
 Astley Baker Davies Ltd.
 Ben & Holly's Little Kingdom official site
 Peppa Pig official site

Entertainment One
British animation studios
Mass media companies established in 1994
2015 mergers and acquisitions
Television production companies of the United Kingdom
1994 establishments in the United Kingdom